Junlian County  is a county of Sichuan Province, China. It is under the administration of Yibin city. At the end of 2019 it has a population of 450,176 of which 151,322 in the urban area. It is one of the most important coal mining areas of Sichuan.

Administrative divisions 
Junlian administers seven towns and five townships:

 Junlian town (筠连镇), county seat
 Tengda town (腾达镇)
 Xunsi town (巡司镇)
 Mu'ai town (沐爱镇)
 Zhenzhou town (镇舟镇)
 Haoba town (蒿坝镇)
 Daxueshan town (大雪山镇)
 Leyi township (乐义乡)
 Tuanlin Miao Ethnic Township (团林苗族乡)
 Lianhe Miao Ethnic Township (联合苗族乡)
 Gaoping Miao Ethnic Township (高坪苗族乡)
 Fengle township (丰乐乡)

Cuisine 
Junlian's speciality cuisine includes:

 Sichuan peppercorn chicken (Jiaoma chicken)
 Kuding tea
 Hunshuiba crackers,
 Junlian Noodles: A starch product made from Junlian sweet potato powder as the main raw material.
 Junlian beef
 Junlian black jelly

Climate

Wildlife
The Junlian odorous frog, Odorrana junlianensis, is a species of frog that was described as a new species based on specimens from Junlian.

References

 
Counties and districts of Yibin